Simon Scott (born 3 March 1971) is an English musician, best known as the drummer in Slowdive and formerly of Lowgold and The Charlottes. He also fronted Inner Sleeve/Televise, and has released ambient music as a solo artist.

Career
Born in Cambridge, Scott first started drumming with female fronted Huntingdon band The Charlottes in 1987 at the age of 16, having recorded two studio tracks a year earlier as part of Honey Chainsaw. He left the Charlottes in 1990 to replace original drummer Adrian Sell in Slowdive who supported them in London at The White Horse in Hampstead. He played on albums Just for a Day and Souvlaki, which was voted in The Guardian as "One of the top 50 albums to hear before you die" in 2007. Scott left the band after 5 EP was released in early 1994, prior to the band working on their third album Pygmalion, but rejoined in 2014 when they announced their reformation.

Scott formed and fronted Inner Sleeve in 1997 who released two singles in 1998 and an album  Looking Up in 1999, all on the Fierce Panda label.

In 1999, Scott split Inner Sleeve up to join Lowgold following the departure of original drummer Paul Mayes, appeared on one track on the band's debut album Just Backward of Square and toured it extensively (supporting Coldplay and Grandaddy) with the band. He left the band in 2002 after the band ran into financial problems following the collapse of Nude Records. Demo's recorded prior to the collapse of Nude and his departure were later released on the compilation Keep Music Miserable including the track ″Time Reclaims All Frontiers″, which was premiered at Reading Festival.

Scott then reformed Inner Sleeve as Televise with new musicians and signed to London record label Club AC30. He has also played in the bands The Sight Below, Seavault (on Morr Music), Chapterhouse and Conformists (with Jasper TX).

In 2006, Scott established an electronic experimental record label KESHHHHHH Recordings, working as a musician and sound artist from his Cambridge recording studio and was remixed on an album called 88 Tapes by Lawrence English, Sawako, Moskitoo, Greg Davis, Benoit Pioulard, Christopher Bissonnette, Mark Templeton, and many more.

2009 saw the release of Scott's debut solo album, Navigare on Miasmah Records. Reviews called it a "Tour-De-Force" and UK music website Boomkat said that the album "transcends the usual parameters of drone music".

In 2010, Scott released the limited 7" "Depart, Repeat". A second album called Bunny on Miasmah was released on 7 October 2011. Scott also performed at Seattle festival Decibel the same year.

The album Below Sea Level was released on 12k in May 2012 and was accompanied by an 80-page journal written whist recording in the sunken areas of The Fens in East Anglia where the album is conceptually based.

Scott occasionally performs live with The Sight Below and co-wrote/co-produced three tracks on the second album It All Falls Apart released in April 2010 on Ghostly International. In January 2012 Kompakt released Pop Ambient 2012 which featured Scott's track "For Martha" and also Pop Ambient 2014 includes his track ″Für Betty″. Scott also drums and co-writes on acoustic guitarist James Blackshaw's album Fantomas: Le Faux Magistrat on Tompkins Square released July 2014 and drums on Blackshaw's 2015 album Summoning Suns.

Slowdive reformed in January 2014, toured globally and began recording a fourth album that was released to critical acclaim in 2017.

In 2015 Scott's Below Sea Level was re-released by UK label/Arts organisation Touch Music, followed in 2019 by his 'Soundings' album for the label.

In December 2020, Scott released "Apart" on 12K.

Solo discography
Navigare (Miasmah) – October 2009
Nivalis 3" CD (Secret Furry Hole) – January 2010
Silenne CD (Slaapwel) – August 2010
Conformists vinyl LP film soundtrack with Dag Rosenqvist (Low Point) – October 2010
Depart, Repeat 7" (Sonic Pieces) – February 2011
Bunny (Miasmah) – 7 October 2011
Pop Ambient 2012 (Kompakt) – 29 January 2012
Below Sea Level (12k) – 29 May 2012
Pop Ambient 2014 (Kompakt) – 27 January 2014
Below Sea Level Touch – 6 March 2015
Insomni (Ash International) – 25 September 2015

References

External links
Website: Simon Scott

1971 births
Living people
English drummers
British male drummers
People from Cambridge
Musicians from Cambridgeshire
21st-century drummers
21st-century British male musicians